Kunal Ghosh (born 30 March 1986) is an Indian footballer who plays as a midfielder for ONGC in the I-League.

Career statistics

Club
Statistics accurate as of 11 May 2013

References

External links
Profile at I-League

Indian footballers
1986 births
Living people
Footballers from West Bengal
I-League players
ONGC FC players
Association football midfielders
Calcutta Football League players